Javier Andrés González Tupper, (born 26 February 1988) is a Venezuelan former footballer who played as a defender.

In 2016, González retired from football and was selected to participate in the 17th edition of the FIFA Master. After graduating, he worked in Switzerland for Sportradar, and later moved to Asunción to work for FIFA's Development Office.

Career
González began his collegiate career playing for the NCAA Division I St. Francis Brooklyn Terriers. He played all four years, from 2006–2009, as a defender and appeared in 68 matches for St. Francis, tallying six goals, four assists and 16 career points. While a member of the Terriers, González was selected to play for Venezuela's U-20 National Team at the South American Youth Championships in 2006. Gonzalez was also selected to travel with the Venezuela national team as they took on Mexico in an "international friendly" in Atlanta, Georgia on June 25, 2009. At the conclusion of the 2009 regular season with the Terriers, he was selected to the Northeast Conference All-Second Team as well as the NSCAA/Adidas All-North Atlantic Region Second Team.  With Gonzalez anchoring the defense, the team qualified for the NEC Tournament, their first playoff appearance in nine years.

González then debuted professionally with Deportivo Petare and played 3 years with the club from 2010–2013. With Petare he logged 4,833 minutes while appearing in 57 matches.  He scored his first professional goal on November 6, 2011, in the 76th minute against Yaracuyanos to lead Deportivo Petare to a 1-0 victory.  The next season, he notched his second career goal in the 8th minute of a 3-1 victory against Real Esppor back on August 19.

In 2013, González started in all thirty-three matches for Atlético Venezuela, logging a grand-total of 2,941 minutes while scoring the game-tying goal against Trujillanos back on December 1, 2013 at the Estadio Nacional Brigido Iriarte in Caracas.

In 2014, González reached a deal with Ñublense.

Personal life
González was born of a Venezuelan father, Luis Miguel González, and a mother of Chilean descent, María Tupper, who is the cousin of popular former Chilean footballer Raimundo Tupper. Since his maternal grandfather is Chilean, he holds the Chilean nationality by descent.

References

External links
 

1988 births
Living people
Venezuelan people of Chilean descent
Sportspeople of Chilean descent
Footballers from Caracas
Venezuelan footballers
Venezuela international footballers
Venezuela under-20 international footballers
St. Francis Brooklyn Terriers men's soccer players
Deportivo Miranda F.C. players
Atlético Venezuela C.F. players
Ñublense footballers
Venezuelan Primera División players
Chilean Primera División players
Venezuelan expatriate footballers
Venezuelan expatriate sportspeople in the United States
Venezuelan expatriate sportspeople in Chile
Expatriate soccer players in the United States
Expatriate footballers in Chile
FIFA Master alumni
Venezuelan expatriate sportspeople in Switzerland
Venezuelan expatriate sportspeople in Paraguay
Association football defenders
Citizens of Chile through descent
Naturalized citizens of Chile